Frank Howarth is an architect and woodworker based in Portland, Oregon. He is known for his stop-motion videos that demonstrate his design and building process which he publishes on his YouTube channel.

References

Living people
Year of birth missing (living people)
American woodworkers
Architects from Portland, Oregon